Charles Pierrepont may refer to:

Charles Pierrepont, 1st Earl Manvers (1737–1816), British peer
Charles Pierrepont, 2nd Earl Manvers (1778–1860), British peer
Charles Pierrepont, 4th Earl Manvers (1854–1926), British peer
Charles Evelyn Pierrepont, Viscount Newark (1805–1850), Member of Parliament for East Retford, and poet